The United States District Court for the Western District of Washington (in case citations, W.D. Wash.) is the federal district court whose jurisdiction comprises the following counties of the state of Washington: Clallam, Clark, Cowlitz, Grays Harbor, Island, Jefferson, King, Kitsap, Lewis, Mason, Pacific, Pierce, San Juan, Skagit, Skamania, Snohomish, Thurston, Wahkiakum, and Whatcom. Its courthouse, built in 2004, is located at 7th and Stewart in Seattle.

As of the 2000 census, 4.6 million people resided in the Western District, representing 78% of the state's population. The district includes the cities of Bellingham, Bremerton, Seattle, Bellevue, Olympia, Vancouver, Everett, and Tacoma, amongst others.

Cases from the Western District of Washington are appealed to the United States Court of Appeals for the Ninth Circuit (except for patent claims and claims against the U.S. government under the Tucker Act, which are appealed to the Federal Circuit).

The United States Attorney's Office for the Western District of Washington represents the United States in civil and criminal litigation in the court. , the United States Attorney is Nicholas W. Brown. The position of United States Marshal for the district is currently vacant.

Current judges 
:

Vacancies and pending nominations

Former judges

Chief judges

Succession of seats

See also
 Courts of Washington
 List of current United States district judges
 List of United States federal courthouses in Washington

Notes

References

External links
 
 United States Attorney for the Western District of Washington official website

Washington, Western District
Bellingham, Washington
Seattle
Tacoma, Washington
1905 establishments in Washington (state)
Courthouses in Washington (state)
Courts and tribunals established in 1905